One hundred and seventy-two municipalities in the Canadian province of Quebec held mayoral and council elections in late 2002. Most held their elections on November 3, although a small number chose alternate dates.

Results

Source for results: "Election 2002 Eastern Townships," Sherbrooke Record, 4 November 2002, p. 4.

References

 
Quebec municipal elections
Municipal elections
Quebec municipal elections
2002